József Szabó (11 May 1896 – 17 March 1973), also referred to as Joseph Szabo or José Szabo, was a former Hungarian footballer and football manager. As a player, he played for both Ferencvárosi TC and Hungary.

He coached a large number of Portuguese teams, including FC Porto, Sporting Clube de Portugal and Sporting Braga.

Honours

Player
Ferencvárosi
 Magyar Kupa: 1921–22

Manager
FC Porto
 Portuguese Liga: 1934–35
 Portuguese Cup: 1931–32
 Porto Championship (6): 1930–31, 1931–32, 1932–33, 1933–34, 1934–35, 1935–36

Sporting CP
 Portuguese Liga (3): 1940–41, 1943–44, 1953–54
 Portuguese Cup (3): 1940–41, 1944–45, 1953–54
 Lisbon Championship (6): 1937–38, 1938–39, 1940–41, 1941–42, 1942–43, 1944–45
 Taca Imperio: 1943–44

References

1896 births
1973 deaths
20th-century Hungarian people
Sportspeople from Győr-Moson-Sopron County
Hungarian footballers
Association football midfielders
Ferencvárosi TC footballers
Szombathelyi Haladás footballers
C.D. Nacional players
Nemzeti Bajnokság I players
Hungary international footballers
Hungarian expatriate footballers
Hungarian expatriate sportspeople in Portugal
Expatriate footballers in Portugal
Hungarian football managers
FC Porto managers
S.C. Braga managers
Sporting CP managers
S.C. Olhanense managers
Portimonense S.C. managers
Atlético Clube de Portugal managers
Leixões S.C. managers
Angola national football team managers
Primeira Liga managers
Hungarian expatriate football managers
Hungarian expatriate sportspeople in Angola
Expatriate football managers in Portugal
Expatriate football managers in Angola